Tivoli Enterprises was a British company manufacturing amusement rides, located in Canterbury. 
 
The company's status is listed as "dissolved". 
It is known for building thrilling amusement rides. 
Born in England, this company was started by Richard Woolls. 
Amtech International acts as a representative for the American companies who want to buy their rides in the U.S. The official factory was located in Canterbury, Kent.
Their list of rides include:
Force 10 / Paratrooper / Tip Top
Orbiter / Predator / Typhoon
Remix / Soundfactory / Extreme
Big Wheel
Move It
Scorpion / Troika
Spin Out—Made along with KMG (company) Rides.
Warp 10 / Exciter

References

British companies established in 1977
Amusement ride manufacturers
1998 disestablishments in the United Kingdom